Zersetzung (German for "decomposition" and "disruption") was a psychological warfare technique used by the Ministry for State Security (Stasi) to repress political opponents in East Germany during the 1970s and 1980s. Zersetzung served to combat alleged and actual dissidents through covert means, using secret methods of abusive control and psychological manipulation to prevent anti-government activities. People were commonly targeted on a pre-emptive and preventative basis, to limit or stop politically incorrect activities that they may have gone on to perform, and not on the basis of crimes they had actually committed. Zersetzung methods were designed to break down, undermine, and paralyze people behind "a facade of social normality" in a form of "silent repression".

Erich Honecker's succession to Walter Ulbricht as First Secretary of the Socialist Unity Party of Germany (SED) in May 1971 saw an evolution of "operational procedures" (Operative Vorgänge) conducted by Stasi away from the overt terror of the Ulbricht era towards what came to be known as Zersetzung ("Anwendung von Maßnahmen der Zersetzung"), which was formalized by Directive No. 1/76 on the Development and Revision of Operational Procedures in January 1976. The Stasi used operational psychology and its extensive network of between 170,000 and over 500,000 informal collaborators (inoffizielle Mitarbeiter) to launch personalized psychological attacks against targets to damage their mental health and lower chances of a "hostile action" against the state. Among the collaborators were youths as young as 14 years of age.

The use of Zersetzung is well documented due to Stasi files published after the Berlin wall fell, with several thousands or up to 10,000 individuals estimated to have become victims, 5,000 of whom sustained irreversible damage. Special pensions for restitution have been created for Zersetzung victims.

Definition
The Ministry for State Security (German: Ministerium für Staatssicherheit, MfS), commonly known as the Stasi, was the main security service of the German Democratic Republic (East Germany or GDR), and defined Zersetzung in its 1985 dictionary of political operatives as

The term Zersetzung is generally translated into English as "decomposition", although it can be variously translated as "decay", "corrosion", "undermining", "biodegradation", or "dissolution". The term was first used in a prosecutorial context in Nazi Germany, namely as part of the term Wehrkraftzersetzung (or Zersetzung der Wehrkraft). In Western parlance, Zersetzung can be described as the active application of psychological destabilisation procedures by the State apparatus.

Historical and political context and goals

The German Democratic Republic (GDR) was established in October 1949 as a socialist state from the Soviet Zone of Occupation, and ruled by the Socialist Unity Party of Germany (SED). During its first decade of the GDR's existence, the SED under General Secretary Walter Ulbricht consolidated their rule by overtly combating political opposition, which it subdued primarily through the penal code by accusing them of incitement to war or of calls of boycott and processing them through the regular criminal judiciary. In 1961, to counteract the GDR's practice of isolationism following the construction of the Berlin Wall, the judicial terror was gradually abandoned. At the end of the 1960s, the GDR's desire for international recognition and rapprochement with the Federal Republic of Germany (West Germany) led to a commitment to adhere to the U.N. Charter.

On 3 May 1971, with the blessing of the USSR's leadership, Erich Honecker became First Secretary of the SED, replacing Ulbricht for an ostensible reason of poor health. Honecker sought to burnish the GDR's international reputation while fighting internal opposition by intensification of the Stasi'''s efforts to punish dissident behaviors without using the penal code. The GDR signed the Basic Treaty, 1972 with West Germany to respect human rights, or at least announce its intention to do so, and the Helsinki accords in 1975.Art. 1 Abs. 3 UN-Charta. Dokumentiert in: 12. Deutscher Bundestag: Materialien der Enquete-Kommission zur Aufarbeitung von Geschichte und Folgen der SED-Diktatur in Deutschland. Band 4, Frankfurt a. M. 1995, S. 547. Consequently, the SED regime decided to reduce the number of political prisoners, which was compensated for by practising dissident repression without imprisonment or court judgements.Jens Raschka: Einschüchterung, Ausgrenzung, Verfolgung – Zur politischen Repression in der Amtszeit Honeckers. Berichte und Studien, Band 14, Dresden 1998, S. 15.

British journalist Luke Harding, who had experienced treatment on the part of Russia's FSB in Vladimir Putin's Russia that was similar to Zersetzung, writes in his book:

In practice

The Stasi used Zersetzung essentially as a means of psychological oppression and persecution. Findings of operational psychology were formulated into method at the Stasi's College of Law (Juristische Hochschule der Staatssicherheit, or JHS), and applied to political opponents in an effort to undermine their self-confidence and self-esteem. Operations were designed to intimidate and destabilise them by subjecting them to repeated disappointment, and to socially alienate them by interfering with and disrupting their relationships with others as in social undermining. The aim was to induce personal crises in victims, leaving them too unnerved and psychologically distressed to have the time and energy for anti-government activism. The Stasi intentionally concealed their role as mastermind of the operations.Pingel-Schliemann: Formen. S. 235. Author Jürgen Fuchs was a victim of Zersetzung and wrote about his experience, describing the Stasi's actions as "psychosocial crime", and "an assault on the human soul".

Although its techniques had been established effectively by the late 1950s, Zersetzung was not rigorously defined until the mid-1970s, and only then began to be carried out in a systematic manner in the 1970s and 1980s. It is difficult to determine how many people were targeted, since the sources have been deliberately and considerably redacted; it is known, however, that tactics varied in scope, and that a number of different departments implemented them. Overall there was a ratio of four or five authorised Zersetzung operators for each targeted group, and three for each individual. Some sources indicate that around 5,000 people were "persistently victimised" by Zersetzung. At the College of Legal Studies, the number of dissertations submitted on the subject of Zersetzung was in double figures. It also had a comprehensive 50-page Zersetzung teaching manual, which included numerous examples of its practice.

Units involved
Almost all Stasi departments were involved in Zersetzung operations, although first and foremost amongst these was the headquarters of the Stasi's directorate XX (Hauptabteilung XX) in Berlin, and its divisional offices in regional and municipal government. The function of the headquarters and Abteilung XXs was to maintain surveillance of religious communities; cultural and media establishments; alternative political parties; the GDR's many political establishment-affiliated mass social organisations; sport; and education and health services - effectively covering all aspects of civic life. The Stasi made use of the means available to them within, and as a circumstance of, the GDR's closed social system. An established, politically motivated collaborative network (politisch-operatives Zusammenwirken, or POZW) provided them with extensive opportunities for interference in such situations as the sanctioning of professionals and students, expulsion from associations and sports clubs, and occasional arrests by the Volkspolizei (the GDR's quasi-military national police). Refusal of permits for travel to socialist states, or denial of entry at Czechoslovak and Polish border crossings where no visa requirement existed, were also arranged. The various collaborators (Partner des operativen Zusammenwirkens) included branches of regional government, university and professional management, housing administrative bodies, the Sparkasse public savings bank, and in some cases head physicians. The Stasi's Linie III (Observation), Abteilung 26 (Telephone and room surveillance), and M (Postal communications) departments provided essential background information for the designing of Zersetzung techniques, with Abteilung 32 procuring the required technology.

The Stasi collaborated with the secret services of other Eastern Bloc countries to implement Zersetzung. One such example was the Polish secret services co-operating against branches of the Jehovah's Witnesses organisation in the early 1960s, which would come to be known as "innere Zersetzung" (internal subversion).

Use against individuals
The Stasi applied Zersetzung before, during, after, or instead of incarcerating the targeted individual. The implementation of Zersetzungeuphemistically called Operativer Vorgang ("operational procedure")generally did not aim to gather evidence against the target in order to initiate criminal proceedings. Rather, the Stasi considered Zersetzung as a separate measure to be used when official judiciary procedures were undesirable for political reasons, such as the international image of the GDR.Lehrmaterial der Hochschule des MfS: Anforderungen und Wege für eine konzentrierte, rationelle und gesellschaftlich wirksame Vorgangsbearbeitung. Kapitel 11: Die Anwendung von Maßnahmen der Zersetzung in der Bearbeitung Operativer Vorgänge vom Dezember 1977, BStU, ZA, JHS 24 503, S. 11. However, in certain cases, the Stasi did attempt to entrap individuals, as for example in the case of Wolf Biermann: The Stasi set him up with minors, hoping that they could then pursue criminal charges. The crimes targeted for such entrapment were non-political, such as drug possession, trafficking, theft, financial fraud, and rape.

Directive 1/76 lists the following as tried and tested forms of Zersetzung, among others:

Beginning with intelligence obtained by espionage, the Stasi established "sociograms" and "psychograms" which it applied for the psychological forms of Zersetzung. They exploited personal traits, such as homosexuality, as well as supposed character weaknesses of the targeted individualfor example a professional failure, negligence of parental duties, pornographic interests, divorce, alcoholism, dependence on medications, criminal tendencies, passion for a collection or a game, or contacts with circles of the extreme rightor even the veil of shame from the rumors poured out upon one's circle of acquaintances.Arbeit der Juristischen Hochschule der Staatssicherheit in Potsdam aus dem Jahr 1978, MDA, MfS, JHS GVS 001-11/78. In: Pingel-Schliemann: Formen. S. 237. From the point of view of the Stasi, the measures were the most fruitful when they were applied in connection with a personality; all "schematism" had to be avoided.

Tactics and methods employed under Zersetzung generally involved the disruption of the victim's private or family life. This often included psychological attacks, in a form of gaslighting. Other practices included property damage, sabotage of cars, purposely incorrect medical treatment, smear campaigns including sending falsified compromising photos or documents to the victim's family, denunciation, provocation, psychological warfare, psychological subversion, wiretapping, and bugging.  

It has been investigated, but not definitely established, that the Stasi used  X-ray devices in a directed and weaponised manner to cause long-term health problems in its opponents. That said, Rudolf Bahro, Gerulf Pannach, and Jürgen Fuchs, three important dissidents who had been imprisoned at the same time, died of cancer within an interval of two years. A study by the Federal Commissioner for the Records of the State Security Service of the former GDR (Bundesbeauftragte für die Unterlagen des Staatssicherheitsdienstes der ehemaligen Deutschen Demokratischen Republik or BStU) has meanwhile rejected on the basis of extant documents such as fraudulent use of X-rays, and only mentions isolated and unintentional cases of the harmful use of sources of radiation, for example to mark documents.

In the name of the target, the Stasi made little announcements, ordered products, and made emergency calls, to terrorize them.Gieseke: Mielke-Konzern. S. 196f. To threaten or intimidate or cause psychoses the Stasi assured itself of access to the target's living quarters and left visible traces of its presence, by adding, removing, and modifying objects such as the socks in one's drawer, or by altering the time that an alarm clock was set to go off.

Use against groups and social relations
The Stasi manipulated relations of friendship, love, marriage, and family by anonymous letters, telegrams and telephone calls as well as compromising photos, often altered. In this manner, parents and children were supposed to systematically become strangers to one another. To provoke conflicts and extramarital relations the Stasi put in place targeted seductions by Romeo agents.

For the Zersetzung of groups, it infiltrated them with unofficial collaborators, sometimes minors. The work of opposition groups was hindered by permanent counter-propositions and discord on the part of unofficial collaborators when making decisions. To sow mistrust within the group, the Stasi made believe that certain members were unofficial collaborators; moreover by spreading rumors and manipulated photos, the Stasi feigned indiscretions with unofficial collaborators, or placed members of targeted groups in administrative posts to make others believe that this was a reward for the activity of an unofficial collaborator. They even aroused suspicions regarding certain members of the group by assigning privileges, such as housing or a personal car. Moreover, the imprisonment of only certain members of the group gave birth to suspicions.

Targeted groups
 
The Stasi used Zersetzung tactics both on individuals and groups. There was no particular homogeneous target group, as opposition in the GDR came from a number of different sources. Tactical plans were thus separately adapted to each perceived threat. The Stasi nevertheless defined several main target groups:

 associations of people making collective visa applications for travel abroad
 artists' groups critical of the government
 religious opposition groups
 youth subculture groups
 groups supporting the above (human rights and peace organisations, those assisting illegal departure from the GDR, and expatriate and defector movements).

The Stasi also occasionally used Zersetzung on non-political organisations regarded as undesirable, such as the Watchtower Society.

Prominent individuals targeted by Zersetzung operations included Jürgen Fuchs, Gerulf Pannach, Rudolf Bahro, Robert Havemann, Rainer Eppelmann, Reiner Kunze, husband and wife Gerd and Ulrike Poppe, and Wolfgang Templin.

Public awareness and legal aspects
Once aware of his own status as a target, GDR opponent Wolfgang Templin tried, with some success, to bring details of the Stasi's Zersetzung activities to the attention of western journalists. In 1977 Der Spiegel published a five-part article series, "Du sollst zerbrechen!" ("You're going to crack!"), by the exiled Jürgen Fuchs, in which he describes the Stasi's "operational psychology". The Stasi tried to discredit Fuchs and the contents of similar articles, publishing in turn claims that he had a paranoid view of its function, and intending that Der Spiegel and other media would assume he was suffering from a persecution complex.Treffbericht des IMB "J. Herold" mit Oberleutnant Walther vom 25. März 1986 über ein Gespräch mit dem "abgeschöpften" SPIEGEL-Redakteur Ulrich Schwarz. Dok. in Jürgen Fuchs: Magdalena. MfS, Memphisblues, Stasi, Die Firma, VEB Horch & Gauck – Ein Roman. Berlin 1998, S. 145. This, however, was refuted by the official Stasi documents examined after Die Wende (the political power shift in the GDR in 1989–90).

Because the scale and nature of Zersetzung were unknown both to the general population of the GDR and to people abroad, revelations of the Stasi's malicious tactics were met with some degree of disbelief by those affected. Many still nowadays express incomprehension at how the Stasi's collaborators could have participated in such inhuman actions.

Since Zersetzung as a whole, even after 1990, was not deemed to be illegal because of the principle of nulla poena sine lege (no penalty without law), actions against involvement in either its planning or implementation were not enforceable by the courts. Because this specific legal definition of Zersetzung as a crime didn't exist, only individual instances of its tactics could be reported. Acts which even according to GDR law were offences (such as the violation of Briefgeheimnis, the secrecy of correspondence) needed to have been reported to the GDR authorities soon after having been committed in order not to be subject to a statute of limitations clause. Many of the victims experienced the additional complication that the Stasi was not identifiable as the originator in cases of personal injury and misadventure. Official documents in which Zersetzung methods were recorded often had no validity in court, and the Stasi had many files detailing its actual implementation destroyed.

Unless they had been detained for at least 180 days, survivors of Zersetzung operations, in accordance with §17a of a 1990 rehabilitation act (the Strafrechtlichen Rehabilitierungsgesetzes, or StrRehaG), are not eligible for financial compensation. Cases of provable, systematically effected targeting by the Stasi, and resulting in employment-related losses and/or health damage, can be pursued under a law covering settlement of torts (Unrechtsbereinigungsgesetz, or 2. SED-UnBerG) as claims either for occupational rehabilitation or rehabilitation under administrative law. These overturn certain administrative provisions of GDR institutions and affirm their unconstitutionality. This is a condition for the social equalisation payments specified in the Bundesversorgungsgesetz (the war victims relief act of 1950). Equalisation payments of pension damages and for loss of earnings can also be applied for in cases where victimisation continued for at least three years, and where claimants can prove need. The above examples of seeking justice have, however, been hindered by various difficulties victims have experienced, both in providing proof of the Stasi's encroachment into the areas of health, personal assets, education and employment, and in receiving official acknowledgement that the Stasi was responsible for personal damages (including psychological injury) as a direct result of Zersetzung operations.

Use of similar techniques in other countries

Under Vladimir Putin, Russia's security and intelligence agencies have been reported to have employed similar techniques against foreign diplomats and journalists in Russia and other ex-USSR states.Russian spy agency targeting western diplomats, The Guardian, 2011-7-23

In 2016, Zersetzung-like harassment was reported by the American press as carried out by Russia's secret services against U.S. diplomats posted in Moscow as well as in unspecified "several other European capitals"; the U.S. government's efforts to raise the issue with the Kremlin were said to have brought no positive reaction. The Russian Embassy's reply was cited by The Washington Post as implicitly admitting and defending the harassment as a response to what Russia called U.S. provocations and mistreatment of Russian diplomats in the United States. The Russian Foreign Ministry's spokesperson in turn accused the FBI and CIA of provocations and "psychological pressure" vis-à-vis the Russian diplomats.

See also

Literature
Annie Ring. After the Stasi: Collaboration and the Struggle for Sovereign Subjectivity in the Writing of German Unification. 280 pages, Bloomsbury Academic (October 22, 2015) .
Max Hertzberg. Stealing the Future (The East Berlin Series) (Book 1), 242 pages, Wolf Press (August 8, 2015), .
Josie McLellan. Love in the Time of Communism: Intimacy and Sexuality in the GDR. 250 pages, Cambridge University Press (October 17, 2011), 
Mike Dennis. 'Tackling the enemy- quiet repression and preventive decomposition' in The Stasi Myth and Reality. 269 pages, Pearson Education Limited (2003), 
Sandra Pingel-Schliemann: Zersetzen. Strategie einer Diktatur. Eine Studie (= Schriftenreihe des Robert-Havemann-Archivs. 8). 3. Auflage. Robert-Havemann-Gesellschaft, Berlin (2004), .
Udo Grashoff. 'Zersetzung (GDR)' in Global Encyclopaedia of Informality, Volume 2: Understanding Social and Cultural Complexity, pp.452-455, UCL Press (2018),  
Andreas Glaesar. 'Decomposing people and groups' in Political Epistemics: The Secret Police, the Opposition, and the End of East German Socialism''. pp. 494-501, University of Chicago, Chicago (2011),

References

External links
 Hubertus Knabe (historian) The dark secrets of a surveillance state, TED Salon, 19 minutes,· Filmed June 2014, Berlin

German language links
 MfS Richtlinie 1/76 zur „Entwicklung und Bearbeitung operativer Vorgänge – Die Anwendung von Maßnahmen der Zersetzung“ www.bstu.bund.de, accessed 14 December 2015
 Der Einsatz von politisch-operativen Zersetzungsmaßnahmen im Rahmen der operativen Vorgangsbearbeitung gegen Erscheinungen des politischen Untergrundes im Verantwortungsbereich der Linie XX/7. Master's thesis Hochschule des Ministeriums für Staatssicherheit, Potsdam, demokratie-statt-diktatur.de, by Bundesbeauftragter für die Stasi-Unterlagen
 MfS-Richtlinie 1/76 MfS, DDR-Wissen.de, accessed 14 December 2015
 Dr. Sandra Pingel-Schliemann „Leise Formen der Zerstörung“ havemann-gesellschaft.de, lecture for book publication, 23 May 2002, Berlin
 Stasi-in-Erfurt.de: Zersetzungsmaßnahmen am Beispiel einer Umweltgruppe with many original documents 
 Hartmut Holz: Zersetzung: Machtmittel des Ministeriums für Staatssicherheit in der ehemaligen DDR Psychiatrische Praxis, thieme-connect.com, doi 10.1055/s-2005-915501 
 DDR-Wissen.de: Zersetzung, accessed 14 December 2015

Denialism
Deception
Mind control
Human rights abuses in Russia
Russia–United States relations
Stasi
Words and phrases with no direct English translation
German words and phrases